The Kress Building is a historic building in Huntsville, Alabama, U.S.. It was built in 1931 for S. H. Kress & Co., a chain of department stores. It was designed in the Art Deco style by architect Edward Sibbert. It has been listed on the National Register of Historic Places since September 22, 1980.

References

Commercial buildings on the National Register of Historic Places in Alabama
Art Deco architecture in Alabama
Commercial buildings completed in 1931
Buildings and structures in Huntsville, Alabama
1931 establishments in Alabama